William Julius Wilson (born December 20, 1935) is an American sociologist.  He is a professor at Harvard University and author of works on urban sociology, race and class issues. Laureate of the National Medal of Science, he served as the 80th President of the American Sociological Association, was a member of numerous national boards and commissions. He identified the importance of neighborhood effects and demonstrated how limited employment opportunities and weakened institutional resources exacerbated poverty within American inner-city neighborhoods.

Academic career 
Wilson is Lewis P. and Linda L. Geyser University Professor at Harvard University. He is one of 25 University Professors, the highest professional distinction for a Harvard faculty member. After receiving a PhD from Washington State University in 1966, Wilson taught sociology at the University of Massachusetts Amherst, before joining the University of Chicago faculty in 1972. In 1990 he was appointed the Lucy Flower University Professor and director of the University of Chicago's Center for the Study of Urban Inequality. He joined the faculty at Harvard in July 1996.  He is affiliated with the Malcolm Wiener Center for Social Policy at the John F. Kennedy School of Government, the Hutchins Center for African and African American Research, and Harvard's Department of Sociology. He is a member of the Library of Congress Scholars Council.

Wilson was an original board member of the progressive Century Institute, and a current board member at Philadelphia-based Public/Private Ventures as well as PolicyLink and the Center on Budget and Policy Priorities. He was Sudhir Venkatesh's advisor when Venkatesh was a PhD student at the University of Chicago.

Publication
Wilson is the author of Power Racism and Privilege: Race Relations in Theoretical and Sociohistorical Perspectives (1973, 1976), The Declining Significance of Race: Blacks and Changing American Institutions (1978, 1980, 2012), winner of the American Sociological Association's Sydney Spivack Award; The Truly Disadvantaged: The Inner City, the Underclass, and Public Policy (1987, 2012), which was selected by the editors of the New York Times Book Review as one of the 16 best books of 1987, and received The Washington Monthly Annual Book Award, the Society for the Study of Social Problems' C. Wright Mills Award and the American Political Science Association's Aaron Wildavsky Enduring Contribution Award; When Work Disappears: The World of the New Urban Poor (1996), which was selected as one of the notable books of 1996 by the editors of the New York Times Book Review and received the 1997 Hillman Prize and the American Political Science Association's Aaron Wildavsky Enduring Contribution Award; and The Bridge Over the Racial Divide: Rising Inequality and Coalition Politics. More recently, he is the co-author of There Goes the Neighborhood: Racial, Ethnic, and Class Tensions in Four Chicago Neighborhoods and Their Meaning for America (2006), and Good Kids in Bad Neighborhoods: Successful Development in Social Context (2006); and author of More than Just Race: Being Black and Poor in the Inner City (2009).

In The Declining Significance of Race: Blacks and Changing American Institutions (1978) Wilson argues that the significance of race is waning, and that for African Americans, class is comparatively more important in determining their life chances. In The Truly Disadvantaged: The Inner City, the Underclass, and Public Policy (1987), Wilson was one of the first to enunciate at length the "spatial mismatch" theory for the development of a ghetto underclass. As industrial jobs disappeared in cities in the wake of global economic restructuring, and hence urban unemployment increased, women found it unwise to marry the fathers of their children since the fathers would not be breadwinners. In The Truly Disadvantaged Wilson also argued against Charles Murray's theory of welfare causing poverty.

In Wilson's most recent book, More Than Just Race: Being Black and Poor in the Inner City (2009), he directs his attention to the overall framing of pervasive, concentrated urban poverty of African Americans. He asks the question, "Why do poverty and unequal opportunity persist in the lives of so many African Americans?" In response, he traces the history and current state of powerful structural factors impacting African Americans, such as discrimination in laws, policies, hiring, housing, and education. Wilson also examines the interplay of structural factors and the attitudes and assumptions of African Americans, European Americans, and social science researchers. In identifying the dynamic influence of structural, economic, and cultural factors, he argues against either/or politicized views of poverty among African Americans that either focus blame solely on cultural factors or only on unjust structural factors. He tries "to demonstrate the importance of understanding not only the independent contributions of social structure and culture but also how they interact to shape different group outcomes that embody racial inequality." Wilson's goal is to "rethink the way we talk about addressing the problems of race and urban poverty in the public policy arena."

Influence
Wilson's book When Work Disappears has been cited as an inspiration for the second season of the HBO show The Wire.

Criticism of his work
Beginning with The Declining Significance of Race, Wilson's work has attracted a great deal of controversy and criticism, see for example Willie's The Inclining Significance of Race.

In his book Still the Promised City? African-Americans and New Immigrants in Postindustrial New York, Roger Waldinger, a professor of Sociology at the University of California, Los Angeles, provides a critique of arguments advanced by Wilson in The Truly Disadvantaged. In particular, Waldinger challenges Wilson's argument that the labor market problems African Americans face today are largely due to deindustrialization and consequent skills mismatches. Waldinger argues that, on one hand, African Americans never were especially dependent on jobs in the manufacturing sector, so deindustrialization in itself has not had a major impact on African Americans, and that, on the other hand, the relative labor market success of poorly educated immigrants suggests that there is no absence of jobs for those with few skills in the post-industrial era (see Anthony Orum's review of the book). One limitation to the full credibility of Waldinger's study, however, is that it is based entirely on research in New York City and, therefore, its findings are difficult to generalize to cities such as Detroit, Baltimore, Philadelphia, Cleveland, and others where blacks were indeed concentrated in the manufacturing sector.

The concept of 'the ghetto' and 'underclass' has faced criticism both empirically and theoretically. Research has shown significant differences in resources for neighborhoods with similar populations both across cities and over time. This includes differences in the resources of neighborhoods with predominantly low income and/or racial minority populations. It has been argued that the cause of these differences in resources across similar neighborhoods likely has more to do with dynamics outside of the neighborhood. To a large extent the problem with the 'ghetto' and 'underclass' concepts stem from the reliance on case studies (in particular case studies from Chicago), which confine social scientist understandings of socially disadvantaged neighborhoods.

Honors
Past President of the American Sociological Association, Wilson has received 45 honorary degrees, including honorary doctorates from Yale, Princeton University, Columbia University, the University of Pennsylvania, Northwestern University, Johns Hopkins University, New York University, Bard College, Dartmouth College, and the University of Amsterdam in the Netherlands. A MacArthur Prize Fellow from 1987 to 1992, Wilson has been elected to the National Academy of Sciences, the American Academy of Arts and Sciences, the National Academy of Education, the American Philosophical Society, the Institute of Medicine, and the British Academy. In June 1996 he was selected by Time magazine as one of America's 25 Most Influential People. In 1997, he received the Golden Plate Award of the American Academy of Achievement. He is a recipient of the 1998 National Medal of Science, the highest scientific honor in the United States, and was awarded the Talcott Parsons Prize in the Social Sciences by the American Academy of Arts and Sciences in 2003; the Daniel Patrick Moynihan Prize by the Annals of the American Academy of Political and Social Science in 2013; the Robert and Helen Lynd Award for Distinguished Career Achievement by the Community and Urban Section of the American Sociological Association in 2013; and the W.E.B. Du Bois Career of Distinguished Scholarship Award by the American Sociological Association in 2014, the highest award bestowed by the American Sociological Association.

Other honors granted to Wilson include the Seidman Award in Political Economy (the first and only non-economist to receive the award); the Golden Plate Achievement Award; the Distinguished Alumnus Award, Washington State University; the American Sociological Association's Dubois, Johnson, Frazier Award (for significant scholarship in the field of inter-group relations); the American Sociological Association's Award for Public Understanding of Sociology; Burton Gordon Feldman Award ("for outstanding contributions in the field of public policy") Brandeis University; and the Martin Luther King Jr. National Award (granted by the Southern Christian Leadership Conference, Los Angeles); the Diverse: Issues in Higher Education's John Hope Franklin Award; Everett Mendelsohn Excellence in Mentoring Award, Harvard University; and the Anisfield-Wolf Book Award for Lifetime Achievement in Nonfiction. He was designated a Walter Channing Cabot Fellow at Harvard University for 2009–2010. And in 2012, the Inequality, Poverty, and Mobility Section of the American Sociological Association renamed its Early Career Award as the William Julius Wilson Early Career Award.

Wilson also served on a member of numerous national boards and commissions including, the Social Science Research Council, Spelman College, Bard College, National Humanities Center, Levy Economic Institute and Manpower Demonstration Research Corporation. He was previously the Chair of the Board of the Center for Advanced Study in the Behavioral Sciences and of the Russell Sage Foundation.

In 2010, Wilson received the Anisfield-Wolf Book Award Lifetime Achievement Award in Nonfiction.

References

External links

"William Julius Wilson" The John W. Kluge Center at the Library of Congress

Washington State University alumni
1935 births
Living people
African-American social scientists
African-American writers
American social sciences writers
American sociologists
MacArthur Fellows
National Medal of Science laureates
Harvard Kennedy School faculty
University of Chicago faculty
Urban sociologists
Presidents of the American Sociological Association
University of Massachusetts Amherst faculty
American social democrats
Members of the United States National Academy of Sciences
People from Westmoreland County, Pennsylvania
Members of the National Academy of Medicine
Center on Budget and Policy Priorities
The Century Foundation
Fellows of the American Academy of Political and Social Science
Corresponding Fellows of the British Academy
21st-century African-American people
20th-century African-American people
Members of the American Philosophical Society